Tete Morena Dijana (born ) is a South African ultramarathon runner who won the Comrades Marathon in 2022.

Originally from Mahikeng in the North West province, Dijana quit his job as a security guard at North-West University to focus on running.

Career 

In his debut Comrades Marathon in 2019, Dijana finished in 50th place with a time of 6:25:03 and earned a silver medal.

Dijana joined the Nedbank Running Club in 2022.  He finished second in the 2022 Nedbank Breaking Barriers 50 km, one place ahead of Edward Mothibi, a Nedbank teammate and the winner of the 2019 Comrades Marathon.

At the 2022 Comrades Marathon, Dijana and Mothibi ran together as the race leaders during part of the second half of the race.

Notes

References

External links 
 

1988 births
Living people
South African male long-distance runners